The June 1990 Lower Ohio Valley tornado outbreak spawned 65 tornadoes, including seven of F4 intensity, in southern Illinois, central and southern Indiana, southwestern Ohio, and northern Kentucky on June 2–3, 1990.

In Indiana, 37 tornadoes formed, breaking the single-day record of 21 set during the Super Outbreak on April 3, 1974.

Meteorological synopsis
On June 2, an unseasonably intense surface low over eastern North Dakota brought with it a cold front across the Mississippi Valley. Ahead of the front, a highly unstable air mass combined with a strong jet stream that increased the synoptic-scale lifting favoring supercell development. Meanwhile, backed southerly low-level winds brought moist dew points well into the region. The National Severe Storms Forecast Center in Norman, Oklahoma, put out a high risk for severe weather over much of Illinois, Indiana, Ohio, and northern Kentucky. A notable feature of this outbreak is that there was a sector of weak tornadoes north of Terre Haute, Indiana, while a sector of strong and vicious tornadoes developed south of the city. This could perhaps be attributed to the storms in central Indiana having weaker helicity—a measurement of storm rotation—resulting in many of the storms farther to the north being left-moving supercells.

Confirmed tornadoes

June 2 event

Albion/Browns, Illinois

This extremely long-tracked F4 tornado began near Aden, littering I-64 with trees and overturning a truck before striking Barnhill, where 10 homes were destroyed and 10 others were damaged. The tornado then struck Albion, where a factory, homes, and other buildings were destroyed. The tornado then caused severe damage in the Browns area, where one woman was killed in her home. In the town of Mt. Carmel, the tornado ripped apart seventeen homes and severely damaged Wabash Valley College before crossing into Indiana. In Indiana, the tornado passed near Hazleton, Bowman, Petersburg, and Orrville, where a barn was destroyed. In Daviess County, Indiana, the tornado caused $10,000,000 in damage as it destroyed 10 homes and damaged 35 others. A cabin was crushed by a tree as the tornado passed near Shoals, resulting in four injuries. The tornado passed near Whitfield before dissipating near Huron. A total of eleven people were injured by this tornado.

Petersburg, Indiana

A powerful F4 tornado developed west of Union and proceeded to enter that community from Gibson County. After passing through a wooded area, the tornado hit Petersburg, killing four people there. Upon entering the town limits, it leveled a nursing home plus an apartment complex and up to ten homes. Having now killed six people, the tornado was the deadliest to hit Indiana since the 1974 Super Outbreak. It then struck the business district in downtown Petersburg and destroyed 19 businesses before going on to level 168 additional homes and damage an elementary school in Petersburg. The town became the hardest hit in Indiana on June 2, 1990. The tornado destroyed half of Petersburg, including the home of the mayor. 60 others were injured by this tornado.

Bright, Indiana/Harrison, Ohio

A violent nighttime tornado began west of Bright, Indiana, with 50 homes destroyed in that area. Four of the homes were of brick construction, yet were completely leveled. The tornado then continued to produce F4 damage in Ohio as it hit the communities of Harrison, Crosby Township, and New Baltimore. In Hamilton County alone, the tornado damaged 800–900 homes and 31 businesses plus three schools; of these, 32 homes were reported destroyed, some so completely that their foundations were left "practically barren". The tornado continued into the southern part of Fairfield and surrounding areas of Butler County, where 19 homes and four trailers were destroyed, with 58 homes, 22 trailers, and five apartment buildings damaged. The tornado continued into Warren County before dissipating near Mason. A total of 37 people were injured by this tornado.

Aftermath

People erected makeshift shelters in Petersburg as Indiana declared a state of emergency. The tornado outbreak was the most destructive to hit Indiana since the Super Outbreak in 1974. Across Indiana, Illinois, and Kentucky, the entire outbreak resulted in 313 homes destroyed, 76% of them in Indiana alone, and 892 damaged, fully 75% of them in Indiana.

See also
List of North American tornadoes and tornado outbreaks
List of Storm Prediction Center high risk days

References

F4 tornadoes by date
Lower Ohio Valley,1990-06-02
Tornadoes of 1990
Tornadoes in Indiana
Tornadoes in Illinois
1990 natural disasters in the United States
Lower Ohio Valley tornado outbreak